Maurer Motorsport was a German Formula Two racing car constructor and entrant, founded by Willy Maurer, who had connections to the German Mampe drinks company. The team was notable for its involvement in the early careers of future Ferrari designer Gustav Brunner and Formula One driver Stefan Bellof.

Racing history 

Maurer, on behalf of Mampe, had sponsored the Ford-Zakspeed and Kremer-Porsche teams in the DRM German sportscar series, particularly for driver Armin Hahne, and in  entered him in European Formula Two in a chassis of the team's own design with BMW engines. The car only achieved one race start, from which it retired, and Hahne left at the end of the season.

For , Maurer recruited Eje Elgh, who had some experience of the series previously and Austrian driver Markus Höttinger. Results did not initially improve and there were setbacks after Höttinger was killed at Hockenheim when he was hit by a wheel which had become detached from a crashed car and Elgh broke an arm in a testing accident. However, Elgh brought some technical staff from his previous team, Chevron, and by mid-season the car (designated MM80) was more competitive, driven by substitute drivers, Beppe Gabbiani and Helmut Henzler.

For , Elgh continued with the team and was joined by future Formula One driver Roberto Guerrero. At the insistence of the former Chevron staff members, the team base was moved to England and Gustav Brunner joined on a full-time basis. Results improved and Elgh took third place in the championship, with Guerrero seventh.

Towards the end of 1981, Brunner began work on a Cosworth-engined Formula One design for Maurer, but the project was abandoned after Stefan Bellof joined for 1982 and the team became more successful in Formula 2 again.

In , Elgh departed in the hope of a Formula One career and the team recruited Bellof and Gabbiani as the main drivers. Helped by a controversial system which locked the car down at high speed in a similar fashion to the Lotus 88 Formula One car, Bellof won the first two races but a series of protests and reliability problems hampered the rest of the season. Bellof and Gabbiani finished fourth and fifth in the championship respectively.

 was Maurer's last season as a motorsport entrant. The team re-located to Germany and Brunner left to join ATS. There were also engine supply problems and the team achieved no wins, although two victories were lost with last lap reliability issues and scrutineering failures respectively. The season ended with places of ninth and fifteenth in the championship for Bellof and Alain Ferté with a tenth place for Kenny Acheson who achieved one second-place finish for the team. The team folded shortly thereafter, in dispute with the British side of the operation and Bellof moved to Tyrrell in Formula One partly with Willy Maurer's backing.

Complete European Formula Two results
(key) (Results in bold indicate pole position; results in italics indicate fastest lap.)

References

German racecar constructors
German auto racing teams
Formula Two constructors
Auto racing teams established in 1979
Auto racing teams disestablished in 1983